Budza or Buja (Embudja, Limbudza) is a Bantu language of the Democratic Republic of Congo.

There are several neighbouring minor languages which Maho (2009) lists as closely related: C371 Tembo (Motembo or Litembo – distinguish Kitembo), C372 Kunda (Likunda – distinguish Chikunda), C373 Gbuta (Egbuta) and C374 Babale. Only Litembo, with 5,000 speakers, has been assigned an ISO code; Glottolog treats it and Likunda as a single language.

References

Buja-Ngombe languages
Languages of the Democratic Republic of the Congo